The Men's 4 × 100 m Freestyle Relay event at the 2003 Pan American Games took place on August 15, 2003 (Day 15 of the Games). Brazil won the men's 4 × 100 free relay in 3:18.66, shy of their Games record from four years ago. Venezuela was second and Canada third. The USA was disqualified when second swimmer Jayme Cramer left early.

Medalists

Records

Results

References

2003 Pan American Games Results: Day 13, CBC online; retrieved 2009-06-13.
swimmers-world

Freestyle Relay, Men's 4x100m